Service Creek may refer to:
 Service Creek (Haw River tributary), a stream in Alamance County, North Carolina
 Service Creek, Oregon, an unincorporated community